Irja Agnes Browallius (13 October 1901 – 9 December 1968) was a Swedish teacher, novelist and short story writer. She was awarded the Dobloug Prize in 1962.

Personal life
Browallius was born in Helsinki on 13 October 1901, a daughter of actors Carl Browallius and Gerda Pisani. She moved to Sweden shortly after her birth. She died in Lidingö on 9 December 1968.

References

Further reading  
 

1901 births
1968 deaths
Dobloug Prize winners
20th-century Swedish novelists
Swedish women novelists
Swedish women short story writers
Swedish short story writers
20th-century Swedish women writers
20th-century short story writers